The Church of Nuestra Señora de la Asunción (Spanish: Iglesia de Nuestra Señora de la Asunción) is a church located in Elvillar, Spain. It was declared Bien de Interés Cultural in 1984.

References 

Churches in Álava
Bien de Interés Cultural landmarks in Álava